Knights fee may refer to:

 Knight's fee, a unit measure of land deemed sufficient to support a knight in feudal England
 Knight's Fee (novel), a 1960 children's historical novel by Rosemary Sutcliff